Sābūr ibn Sahl (d. 869 CE) was a 9th-century Persian Christian physician from the Academy of Gundishapur.

Among other medical works, he wrote one of the first medical books on antidotes called Aqrabadhin, which was divided into 22 volumes, and which was possibly the earliest of its kind to influence Islamic medicine. This antidotary enjoyed much popularity until it was superseded Ibn al-Tilmidh's version later in the first half of twelfth century.

See also
List of Iranian scientists

References

Further reading
 F. Wustenfled:  arabische Aerzte (25, 1840).

869 deaths
Pharmacologists of medieval Iran
9th-century Iranian physicians
People from Baghdad
Iranian Christians
Year of birth unknown
Members of the Assyrian Church of the East